The Alabama Champion Tree Program is a listing of the largest known specimens of particular tree species, native or introduced, in the U.S. state of Alabama.  It was established in 1970 by the Alabama Forestry Commission.  The program was modeled on the National Register of Big Trees, started by the American Forests organization in 1940.  The goal of Alabama's program is to record, heighten awareness of, and preserve the largest tree specimens in the state.  It uses the same formula for recording tree specimens that was developed by American Forests.  Former champions are removed from the list as new, larger, champions are identified and recorded.  Although introduced species that have naturalized are generally eligible for the program, those species that the Alabama Invasive Plant Council considers to be invasive were removed from the listing in 2011 and are no longer eligible.  With the addition of 20 new specimens in 2011, the program had a total of 159 Champion Trees listed.

Listings

References

Champion Tree Program
A
Lists of trees
Lists of flora of the United States by state
Trees of the Southeastern United States